Mount Xalibu is a mountain located in the unorganized territory of Mont-Albert, in Quebec. It is located in Gaspésie National Park.

Toponymy 
The mountain, without official designation until 2 February 1989, was given the Mi'gmaq name of an animal that inhabits its flanks, the woodland caribou.

Geography

Situation 
Mount Xalibu is located in eastern Canada, in the province of Quebec, on the northern flank of the Gaspé Peninsula.

Topography 
Mount Xalibu is part of the McGerrigle Mountains, formerly called Tabletop (“table top”) because of their constitution in plateaus which surmount steep rock faces.

Geology 
About 400 million years ago, during the Devonian, an intrusion granite was inserted into the rocks sedimentary Paleozoic that form the current Gaspé Peninsula. The summit of Xalibu develops around this batholith. The southern flank of the mountain constitutes one of the walls of the glacial cirque of "Lac aux Américains".

Climate 
There is no station providing continuous climate data at the top of Mount Xalibu; a nearby station makes it possible to establish climatic normals.

Episodes of rain, melting conditions, the formation of ice shells and numerous snowstorms during the winter combine the conditions conducive to the formation of avalanches, common on the walls of the mountain.

The prevailing winds are from the west. Gusts of  have already been recorded there.

Fauna and flora 
The mountain is populated by the last herd of caribou south of the St. Lawrence River.

History

Activities

Winter 
In order to promote the reproduction of woodland caribou, visiting the mountain in winter is strictly prohibited.

Summer 
It is possible to do the ascent of Mount Xalibu when the ground is clear of snow, from the end of June to the end of September, by the International Appalachian Trail from the lake to the Americans, to the west, or from Mont Jacques-Cartier, to the east. In order to shorten the route, it is also possible to take a shuttle from Mont Albert.

Protection status 
The mountain is included in Gaspésie National Park, at the limit of Chic-Chocs Wildlife Reserve.

See also 
 Geography of Quebec
 List of mountains of Quebec

Notes and references 

Appalachian summits
Notre Dame Mountains
La Haute-Gaspésie Regional County Municipality
One-thousanders of Quebec